The Commonwealth Coast Conference (CCC) is an intercollegiate athletic conference affiliated with the NCAA’s Division III. Member institutions are located in New England in the states of Maine, Massachusetts, and Rhode Island, with a Connecticut school joining in 2023.

Overview
The CCC and Commonwealth Coast Football unveiled a new family of logos during a June 2019 visual rebrand.

History

Chronological timeline
 1984 - On 1984, the Commonwealth Coast Conference (CCC) was founded. Charter members included Anna Maria College, Curry College, Emerson College, Hellenic College, Salve Regina College (now Salve Regina University), the United States Coast Guard Academy (Coast Guard) and Wentworth Institute of Technology (Wentworth Tech); effective beginning the 1984-85 academic year.
 1985 - Hellenic left the CCC when the school dropped its athletic program after lasting only one season, effective after the 1984-85 academic year.
 1985 - Roger Williams College (now Roger Williams University) joined the CCC, effective in the 1985-86 academic year.
 1986 - The CCC was granted membership within the National Collegiate Athletic Association (NCAA) Division III ranks, effective in the 1986-87 academic year.
 1987 - The U.S. Coast Guard left the CCC to join the Constitution Athletic Conference, effective after the 1986-87 academic year.
 1987 - Gordon College joined the CCC, effective in the 1987-88 academic year.
 1988 - Regis College joined the CCC, effective in the 1988-89 academic year.
 1989 - Emerson left the CCC to become an NCAA D-III Independent, effective after the 1988-89 academic year.
 1989 - New England College of New Hampshire joined the CCC, effective in the 1989-90 academic year.
 1992 - Eastern Nazarene College joined the CCC, effective in the 1992-93 academic year.
 1995 - Colby–Sawyer College and Nichols College joined the CCC, effective in the 1995-96 academic year.
 1999 - Endicott College and the University of New England of Maine joined the CCC, effective in the 1999-2000 academic year.
 2007 - Western New England University joined the CCC, effective in the 2007-08 academic year.
 2011 - Four member schools left the CCC to join their respective new home primary conferences: Anna Maria to the Great Northeast Athletic Conference (GNAC), Regis (Mass.) to the New England Collegiate Conference (NECC), and Colby–Sawyer and New England (N.H.) to the North Atlantic Conference (NAC), all effective after the 2010-11 academic year.
 2016 - Becker College, Johnson and Wales University, Providence and Suffolk University joined the CCC as associate members for men's ice hockey, effective in the 2016-17 academic year.
 2017 - The CCC added football as a sponsored sport, although not directly as it absorbed the former and defunct New England Football Conference and rebranded as Commonwealth Coast Football (CCC Football), effective in the 2017 fall season (2017-18 academic year).
 2017 - Becker added football to its CCC membership, effective in the 2017 fall season (2017-18 academic year).
 2018 - Eastern Nazarene left the CCC to join the NECC, effective after the 2017-18 academic year.
 2018 - Johnson & Wales and Suffolk left the CCC as associate members for men's ice hockey, effective after the 2017-18 academic year.
 2019 - Husson University joined CCC Football effective in the 2019 fall season (2019-20 academic year).
 2020 - Suffolk returned to the CCC, but with full membership status, effective in the 2020-21 academic year.
 2022
 The University of Hartford announced that it would join the CCC effective with the 2023-24 academic year.
 Salve Regina announced it would leave both the CCC and CCC Football to join the New England Women's and Men's Athletic Conference, also effective in 2023–24.
 Due to changes in NCAA legislation regarding the number of member required for an automatic qualifier (AQ), football was fully incorporated into the CCC multi-sport conference, eliminating the need for the single-sport Commonwealth Coast Football league.
 Johnson & Wales (RI) announced it would join the CCC as soon as the 2024-25 academic year.

Member schools

Current members
The CCC currently has 10 full members, all private schools. Departing member Salve Regina is highlighted in pink.

Notes

Future members
The CCC will have two new full members, also private schools.

Associate members
The CCC currently has one associate member, which is also a private school:

Former members
The CCC had eight former full members, with all but one being private schools.

Notes

Former associate members
The CCC had three former associate members, all were private schools:

Notes

Membership timeline

Sports

The CCC sponsors intercollegiate athletic competition in 20 sports. The conference started sponsoring football in the 2017-18 season, absorbing the former football-only New England Football Conference. From 2017-2021 football was operated as a single-sport conference branded Commonwealth Coast Football. Due to changes in NCAA legislation regarding the number of members required for a for a conference to receive and automatic qualifier (AQ), football was fully incorporated into the multi-sport conference in 2022, eliminating the need for the football-only league. Women's ice hockey was added as a conference sport in 2020-21 when the CCC took over operations of the Colonial Hockey Conference.

References

External links